The Venerable  Robert Edward Vernon Hanson, OBE, MA (29 March 1866 – 7 February 1947), was an eminent Anglican Chaplain in the first half of the 20th century.

Hanson was born on 29 March 1866 and educated at King's College London and Emmanuel College, Cambridge. He was ordained in 1895 and after a curacy at St John's, Richmond, joined the Army Chaplains' Department as Chaplain to the Forces (4th class, ranking as captain)  on 10 December 1900. He was a Chaplain to the British Armed Forces and instructor until 1918.
 He served in the South African War and in Aldershot, Egypt, Dublin, Deepcut, Malta
and the Great War where he was mentioned in despatches.  He joined the fledgling RAF Chaplaincy Service  as Assistant Chief Chaplain
and  became its  Archdeacon (Chaplain-in-Chief) 
in 1926. An Honorary Chaplain to the King he retired in 1930 and died on 7 February 1947.

Notes and references

1866 births
1947 deaths
Alumni of King's College London
Alumni of Emmanuel College, Cambridge
Officers of the Order of the British Empire
Honorary Chaplains to the Queen
Royal Air Force Chaplains-in-Chief
Boer War chaplains
World War I chaplains
Royal Army Chaplains' Department officers